"What?" is the first single release from Rob Zombie's album Hellbilly Deluxe 2 (full title Hellbilly Deluxe 2: Noble Jackals, Penny Dreadfuls and the Systematic Dehumanization of Cool), set for release in early 2010 on Roadrunner Records/Loud & Proud Records.

The song was released on the radio on October 6, 2009 and was released on iTunes October 13.

The intro to the song is a dialogue sampled from the 1977 horror film The Child.

Personnel
Music
Rob Zombie – vocals
John 5 – guitars
Piggy D. – bass
Tommy Clufetos – drums

Art & design
Dan Brereton – artwork
Alex Horley – artwork
David Hartman – artwork
Sam Shearon – artwork
Piggy D. – cover photo
Rob Zombie – cover art

References

External links
Rob Zombie Official Website.

Rob Zombie songs
2009 singles
2009 songs
Roadrunner Records singles
Songs written by Rob Zombie
Songs written by John 5